The Clegg Nunataks is a nunatak group,  long, lying above and southwest of Haselton Icefall in the upper part of Haselton Glacier, in the Willett Range of Victoria Land. Named by the New Zealand Geographic Board in 2005 after Keith Clegg, Information Officer, Antarctic Division, Department of Scientific and Industrial Research from 1979 to 1988.

References

Mountains of Victoria Land
Willett Range